Ochre Health is an Australian healthcare services company headquartered in Sydney. The company specialises in the provision of health services to outer-urban, regional, and remote communities. Ochre Health is an ISO:9001-accredited organisation.

History 

Ochre Health was established in 2002 by doctors Hamish Meldrum and Ross Lamplugh.

Meldrum and Lamplugh were providing General Practice and hospital services in the town of Bourke, NSW, and were concerned by the lack of medical practitioner support that was available to them and their colleagues.  The two doctors decided to take action by establishing a locum doctor recruitment agency, Ochre Recruitment.  The service found itself in high demand and enabled the creation of Ochre Health, which was responsible for providing ongoing management of rural medical services that were under distress by providing recruitment, clinical and administrative governance.

The Ochre Health Foundation was subsequently established in 2005 as a non-profit entity. The primary objective of the Foundation is to provide medical and allied health services to regional and remote communities to aid in the prevention and control of chronic diseases.

Corporate affairs

Senior management 

For the period 2002 to 2010, Dr Hamish Meldrum and Dr Ross Lamplugh provided corporate directorship and management of the company.

Services 

Ochre Health provides a range of clinical management, governance and recruitment services, and employs approximately 400 staff across Australia.  The company has also established relationships with universities to assist with medical student placements and the distribution of experimental programs to remote villages.

Ochre Health works with communities to assist them to address their health workforce and health outcome challenges, by partnering to develop a sustainable and community dictated model of operation.

Services include:

 General practice
 Emergency medicine
 Occupational medicine
 Obstetrics
 Anesthetics
 Dental
 Allied health
 Nursing
 Medical recruitment
 Health administration
 Health Services consulting

Operations 

Ochre Health currently provides medical services to communities across various states and territories of Australia including the Australian Capital Territory, New South Wales, Queensland, Victoria and Tasmania.

These communities exhibited unmet health staffing levels before the organization commenced working with them, and now exhibit record levels of male and female medical practitioners.

Australian Capital Territory 

 Ochre Medical Centre Bruce
Ochre Medical Centre Calwell
Ochre Medical Centre Casey
 Ochre Medical Centre Garran
 Ochre Medical Centre Kingston
Ochre Medical Centre Kippax
Ochre Medical Centre Tuggeranong

New South Wales 

 Ochre Medical Centre Barham
Ochre Medical Centre Bathurst
 Ochre Medical Centre Boggabri
Ochre Medical Centre Bonnells Bay
Ochre Medical Centre Bourke
Ochre Medical Centre Brewarrina
Ochre Medical Centre Collarenebri
Ochre Medical Centre Coonamble
Ochre Medical Centre Cooma
 Ochre Medical Centre Deniliquin
 Ochre Medical Centre Grafton
Ochre Medical Centre Lightning Ridge
 Ochre Medical Centre Lithgow
Ochre Medical Centre Parkes
 Ochre Medical Centre Tea Gardens
Ochre Medical Centre Walgett
 Ochre Medical Centre Wentworth Falls
 Ochre Medical Centre Wollongong

Queensland 
Ochre Medical Centre Caloundra
Ochre Medical Centre Eumundi
Ochre Medical Centre Kingsthorpe
Ochre Medical Centre Maleny
Ochre Medical Centre Montville
Ochre Medical Centre Noosa
Ochre Medical Centre Oakey
Ochre Medical Centre Sippy Downs (Sunshine Coast)
Ochre Medical Centre Wyalla

Victoria 
Ochre Medical Centre Creswick
Ochre Medical Centre Clunes
Ochre Medical Centre Cohuna
Ochre Medical Centre Lancefield

Tasmania 

 Ochre Medical Centre Barrack Street 
Ochre Medical Centre Bridport
Ochre Medical Centre Flinders Island
Ochre Medical Centre North Hobart
 Ochre Medical Centre King Island
 Ochre Medical Centre Queenstown
 Ochre Medical Centre Rosebery
 Ochre Medical Centre St Helens
 Ochre Medical Centre Scottsdale
Ochre Medical Centre Smithton
Ochre Medical Centre Strahan
Ochre Medical Centre Zeehan

Health outcomes

Background 

Ochre Health has a record of providing medical services to communities that have experienced long-term difficulties in attracting and retaining appropriate levels of medical staff, often due to their remoteness or their isolation from social services.

The company also provides services to communities that have high levels of social disadvantage, health outcomes which fall below national averages, and hospitalization rates which fall above national averages.

Primary health care 

Ochre Health has been able to reduce hospitalization rates by up to 20% in communities that exhibited hospitalization rates above national averages by increasing community access to medical practitioners, through which patients' health conditions can be managed, and by adopting best-practice primary care principles as a core tenet of their service delivery model.

The company has also pioneered several new protocols for managing primary care patients, which involves the provision of chronic disease management in towns with high levels of social disadvantage and rates of diabetes and other chronic conditions.

Doctor retention 

Ochre Health has a high doctor retention rate due to their supportive professional development approach toward current medical practitioners, and their ability to provide locum coverage through Ochre Recruitment, which plays a significant role in their ability to retain clinical staff in geographically remote locations.

References

External links 
 Official site
 Recruitment site

Health care companies of Australia
Privately held companies of Australia
Companies based in Sydney
Public services